Desulfatiferula  is a bacteria genus from the family of Desulfobacteraceae.

References

Further reading 
 
 

Desulfobacterales
Bacteria genera